Cnemaspis lineatubercularis is a species of gecko endemic to Thailand.

References

lineatubercularis
Reptiles described in 2020
Fauna of Thailand